Achilleas Salamouras (born 15 January 2000) is a Greek professional footballer who plays as a midfielder for Super League 2 club PAOK B.

References

2000 births
Living people
Greek footballers
Super League Greece 2 players
PAOK FC B players
Association football midfielders
Footballers from Volos